Ošljak is a Croatian island in the Adriatic Sea. Ošljak used to be called Calugerà, after the noble Calogerà family that had owned the island and built its summer residence and gardens there.

References

Islands of Croatia
Islands of the Adriatic Sea
Landforms of Zadar County